Sauroplasma is a genus of parasites of the phylum Apicomplexa.

Species in this genus have two hosts (a vertebrate and an invertebrate) in their life cycle: for species in this genus the vertebrate host are lizards. The vectors are not known but ticks have been suggested as possible hosts.

The type species is Sauroplasma thomasi.

History

This genus was described in 1938 by du Toit.

Description

To date this species has been described from erythrocytes only.

The parasites are amoeboid but frequently adopt a ring shape.

A vacuole is present and occasionally one or more pigment granules.

Schizogony is absent.

Binary fission or budding into two daughter cells occurs.

Host records

 S. boreale - sand lizard (Lacerta agilis)
S. thomasi - great girdled lizard (Zonurus giganteus)

Unknown species

 Jamaican iguana (Cyclura collei)
 Grand Cayman iguana (Cyclura lewisi)
 Cuban rock iguana (Cyclura nubila)
 leaf-tailed gecko (Uroplatus fimbriatus)

References

Piroplasmida
Apicomplexa genera
Parasites of lizards